Manuel Chavez is a Costa Rican judoka. He competed in the men's lightweight event at the 1980 Summer Olympics.

References

Year of birth missing (living people)
Living people
Costa Rican male judoka
Olympic judoka of Costa Rica
Judoka at the 1980 Summer Olympics
Place of birth missing (living people)